Dena Higley (born September 26, 1958) is an American writer, speaker and author.

Early life and career
Higley grew up in East County, San Diego and was the first of three children. She moved to Los Angeles as a teenager eventually graduating from the University of Southern California with a BFA in Theatre. Dena was previously the head writer of the daytime soap operas Days of Our Lives and One Life to Live. In February 2015, Soap Opera Digest confirmed Higley's imminent return to Days of Our Lives, this time alongside Josh Griffith. The pair begin writing for the series on February 16, 2015, with their material airing on August 19, 2015. Higley was fired again in January 2017; she was replaced by Ron Carlivati.

Positions held
Days of Our Lives
Head Writer: March 7, 2003 - August 8, 2003; April 23, 2008 – August 25, 2011
Co-Head Writer: August 11, 2003 - August 18, 2003; August 19, 2015 - July 18, 2017)
Script writer: September 2003 - November 26, 2004
Associate Head Writer: 1985 - March 6, 2003; August 19, 2003 - October 2003

One Life to Live
Head Writer: December 13, 2004 - September 10, 2007

Personal life
Dena has been married for 25 years to Mark and is a mother of four children, including an autistic son Connor, a daughter Jensen, an adopted daughter with physical disability, from Vietnam Adelle, and an adopted son Helio, from Ethiopia. Her current non-fiction book Momaholic: Crazy Confessions of a Helicopter Parent was released April 14, 2012.

Awards and nominations
Daytime Emmy Award
Nominations: 1987, 1994, 1997–1999, and 2006, Best Writing, Days of our Lives
Wins: 2008, Best Writing, One Life to Live
Writers Guild of America Award
Nominations: 1987, 1991, 1993, 2001, and 2005, Days of our Lives
Wins: 1999, Days of our Lives

HW History

|-

|-

|-

References

External links

University of Southern California alumni

1958 births
Living people
American soap opera writers
American women television writers
Place of birth missing (living people)
Women soap opera writers
21st-century American women